Bland County is one of the 141 Cadastral divisions of New South Wales. It contains the town of Temora.

Bland County was named in honour of William Bland who was a medical practitioner and politician between (1789-1868).

Parishes within this county
A full list of parishes found within this county; their current LGA and mapping coordinates to the approximate centre of each location is as follows:

References

Counties of New South Wales